The qualification for the 2003 CONCACAF U-17 Tournament took place between August 2002 and January 2003.

Caribbean Zone

Preliminary round

First leg

Second leg

First round

Group A

Group B
Held in knock-out format.
First Round
8 Sep Antigua/Barbuda  2-0 Grenada
22 Sep Grenada          1-6 Antigua/Barbuda

20 Sep St Kitts/Nevis   1-5 Jamaica
22 Sep Jamaica          2-1 Saint Kitts/Nevis

Jamaica and Antigua/Barbuda advance.

Second Round

Jamaica advanced.

Group C

Group D

Second round

Central American Zone

Group 1

Group 2

References 

CONCACAF Under-17 Championship
U-17
CONCACAF U-17 Championship qualification